Robin Douglas Jones (born 26 February 1973) is a Scottish musician, known as the drummer of The Beta Band and The Aliens.

EPs and albums
Champion Versions (1997)
The Patty Patty Sound (1998)
Los Amigos del Beta Bandidos (1998)
The Beta Band (1999)
Hot Shots II (2001)
Heroes to Zeros (2004)
Astronomy for Dogs (2007)
Luna (2008)

See also
The Beta Band
The Aliens

References

External links
The Aliens' official site
The Aliens' fansite at Betaband.co.uk

Living people
1973 births
20th-century drummers
21st-century drummers
British male drummers
Scottish drummers
20th-century British male musicians
21st-century British male musicians